Karan Gautam Adani (born 7 April 1987) is the chief executive officer (CEO) of Adani Ports & SEZ Limited and the director of Adani Airport Holdings Limited. In 2008, he was included in a list of "Tycoons of Tomorrow" by Forbes India.

Early life 
Karan was born on 7 April 1987, in the state of Gujarat, to Gautam Adani, an Indian industrialist. In 2009, he graduated from Purdue University with a bachelor's degree in economics via the Management School.

Personal life 
In 2013, Adani married Paridhi Shroff,  daughter of Cyril Shroff who is the managing partner of law firm, Cyril Amarchand Mangaldas. In July 2016, they had a daughter.

Career 
In 2009, Karan Adani joined Adani Ports & SEZ Limited (APSEZ). In 2016, he took over the operations of the company.

In 2018, he led an acquisition campaign for Kattupalli port in Tamil Nadu (about 30 km from Chennai Port and adjoining the Ennore Port). The port was acquired from Larsen and Toubro and making it 10th port in APSEZ network.

In 2019, he was appointed to head Adani Group's airport projects which includes; Sardar Vallabhbhai Patel International Airport, Lokpriya Gopinath Bordoloi International Airport, Jaipur International Airport, Chaudhary Charan Singh International Airport, Mangalore International Airport, and Trivandrum International Airport.

Cement maker ACC Ltd said on 16th September 2022  that Karan Adani was named chairman of its board

Awards 
 In 2014, on behalf of Adani Ports & SEZ Limited, he received The Economic Times Award (Category: Emerging Company).

References

External links 
Official profile at Adani Group's website

1987 births
Living people
Adani Group
Karan
21st-century Indian businesspeople
Indian chief executives
Gujarati people
21st-century Indian Jains